Murat Reis may refer to:

Murat Reis the Elder (c. 1534–1609), Ottoman privateer and admiral
Jan Janszoon (c. 1570-c. 1641), Murat Reis the Younger, Dutch pirate and president of the Republic of Salé

See also
Reis (surname)